Fay E. Allen (January 4, 1887 – October 17, 1974) was the first ever African American to serve on the board of the Los Angeles Unified School District (LAUSD). She served two terms between 1939 and 1943. After she left the board, she continued to be politically active until her death.

Background
Fay E. Allen was the daughter of Silas Seth Weeks, an internationally recognized musician, and the former Eliza Jane Clark.  Her parents split up when Fay was a youngster (her father remarried in 1892). Her father, known professionally as S. S. Weeks, moved to Europe and became a member of the Society of Composers in France.

Early education and career

Allen studied music in her native Iowa, Illinois, and Colorado. As a young woman, she would also frequently visit her father in Europe, where she would study piano, pipe organ, and orchestra. Father and daughter would frequently be invited to play for European royalty including King Gustav of Sweden.

Educator and school administrator

Allen was a music teacher at LAUSD and was described as "intelligent, traveled and experienced" in The Los Angeles Times.

She was devoted to the students she worked with and wanted to make a larger impact. In 1937, Allen first ran for a seat on the board and lost. However her initial failure was not a deterrent, and she ran for the seat again in 1939, advocating for standardized, revised and modernized school curriculum, public education beyond just high school, and school board member elections according to district. In her second campaign, she was endorsed by the Federation for Civic Betterment, an organization that was considered radical at the time. Despite the media's view on the Federation, however, they helped assure Allen a seat on the board. She was elected on May 2 and sworn in on Friday, May 26, 1939 (rather than July 1, when the new term officially began), to complete the unexpired term of her predecessor, Margarete Clark.

According to the Los Angeles Times, Mrs. Allen was the first African American woman to hold public office in a major American city.

During her time on the board, Allen received a significant amount of scrutiny, despite the fact that she had an overwhelming amount of support from organizations such as the Los Angeles Teachers Federation, the L.A. Industrial Union Council, and the L.A. Democratic Central Committee. The controversy surrounding her tenure on the board continued both during and after her term.

One of her biggest achievements while serving on the Board was in 1941, during discussions regarding the 1941-42 budget.  There was a provision in the proprosed budget to charge tuition for individuals attending adult education classes.  At first, Mrs. Allen was the only one on the seven member panel who was opposed to the measure. However, after students, teachers, and citizens (including members of the Los Angeles County Democratic Central Committee) joined Mrs. Allen in opposition to the tuition fee at a public hearing, the other six board members reversed their support of the proposal.

In 1943, Mrs. Allen lost her bid for a third term despite endorsements from the American Federation of Teachers, Congress of Industrial Organizations. American Federation of Labor, Spanish Speaking People's Congress, SCMWA, and Musicians Union, Local 767. She also received endorsements from several prominent individuals including Charlotta Bass (publisher of the California Eagle), Assemblyman Augustus Hawkins, actor Clarence Muse, entertainer Ethel Waters, and Al S. Waxman (publisher of the Eastside Journal).

In the primary, Mrs. Allen finished fourth in a race for four at-large seats, but was the only one of the top vote getters not to receive a sufficient number of votes to avoid a run-off.  On May 4 of that year, she faced Marie M. Adams, the fifth-place finisher, in the run-off.  Mrs. Adams was endorsed by the Los Angeles Times and the Daily News. When backers of Mrs. Allen accused supporters of Mrs. Adams of injecting racial bias into the campaign, the Times defended their endorsement by stating, "This newspaper has opposed the election of Mrs. Allen heretofore because The Times has felt that she does not fill the requirements for school administration service. The election of Mrs. Adams is recommended. As in all other ballot recommendations, the suggestions of The Times with respect to Mrs. Allen and Mrs. Adams are based solely on the newspaper's opinion concerning their respective qualifications for office.In contrast, Al S. Waxman, publisher of the Eastside Journal'' wrote a scathing editorial criticising the campaign of Mrs. Adams, which he felt placed an undue emphasis on the race of her opponent.  This was after the paper received a written request by Richmond P. Benton & Sons, a public relations firm representing her campaign, to place a political ad in the Journal. In the letter, the firm indicated that their goal was "to defeat Mrs. Fay Allen, a Negress."

After the votes were tabulated, Mrs. Adams, despite being a political novice, won decisively.  She received more votes than even the three board members that won outright. Mrs. Allen, on the other hand, received even fewer votes than she received in the previous race.

After Mrs. Allen left office, over twenty years would pass before another African American would serve on the Board of Education. Rev. James E. Jones, pastor of the Westminster Presbyterian Church, was sworn in on Monday, June 14, 1965.

Activities after leaving Board of Education

In 1954, Los Angeles County Supervisor Kenneth Hahn appointed Mrs. Allen to the Los Angeles County Music Commission. She was re-appointed by Hahn for another three-year term in 1957.

In 1962, she served as campaign manager in Don Derricks's unsuccessful bid for a seat on the California State Assembly. In a hotly contested seat, Derricks finished third out of eight candidates in the Democratic primary which included Mervyn Dymally (the eventual winner) and Edward A. Hawkins (the brother of the outgoing Assemblyman Augustus Hawkins, who was running for Congress), who finished in second place.

References

Los Angeles Unified School District
Schoolteachers from California
American women music educators
African-American music educators
African-American women musicians
People from Iowa
20th-century African-American women
20th-century African-American people
20th-century African-American musicians
20th-century American pianists
1887 births
1974 deaths